Underoath is an American rock band from Tampa, Florida. Originally formed on November 30, 1997 by vocalist Dallas Taylor and guitarist Luke Morton, the first lineup of the group was completed with the addition of second guitarist Corey Steger, bassist Rey Anasco and drummer Aaron Gillespie. Anasco was soon replaced by Octavio Fernandez. Following the departure of Morton in early 1999, Underoath signed to Takehold Records and released its debut album Act of Depression. The band followed up its debut a year later with Cries of the Past, which featured new members Matthew Clark on bass (Fernandez moved to rhythm guitar) and Christopher Dudley on keyboards. Clark was replaced by Billy Nottke in 2001 and later Grant Brandell in January 2002, while Timothy McTague took over from the departing Steger, who died in March 2021, aged 42, in a car accident.

In July 2003, it was announced that Taylor had left Underoath. He was temporarily replaced on tour by Matt Tarpey, before Spencer Chamberlain joined later in the year. Also in 2003, Fernandez was briefly replaced by Kelly Scott Nunn, before James Smith joined the band later in the year. The lineup of Underoath remained stable until April 2010, when it was announced that Gillespie – the last remaining original member of the band – would be leaving. He was replaced by former Norma Jean drummer Daniel Davison the following month. After one more studio album, 2010's Ø (Disambiguation), Underoath announced a farewell tour, which ended on January 26, 2013. The band returned two years later with original drummer Gillespie returning to the lineup. An eighth studio album, Erase Me, was released in 2018.

Members

Current

Former

Touring

Timeline

Line-ups

References

External links
 

Underoath